Buddy Thunderstruck is an American stop motion tweens and teen's comedy television series created by Ryan Wiesbrock as a Netflix Original series, produced by American Greetings Entertainment and Stoopid Buddy Stoodios and written by Tom Krajewski. The series stars Brian Atkinson, Ted Raimi, Harry Chaskin and Debi Derryberry. The first season was released on Netflix on March 10, 2017. When promoting the first series Netflix billed it as the 'outrageous, high-octane adventures of Buddy Thunderstruck, a truck-racing dog who brings guts and good times to the town of Greasepit'.

Premise
The hard-driving trucking adventures of a dog driver and his ferret mechanic sidekick.

Cast
Brian Atkinson as Buddy Thunderstruck
Ted Raimi as Darnell / Moneybags
Harry Chaskin as Big Tex / Jacko
Debi Derryberry as Muncie / Mama Possum / Old Lady / Mrs. Weaselbrat / Scout
Philip Maurice Hayes as Sheriff Cannonball
Leigh Kelly as Deputy Hoisenberry
Thomas Krajewski as Nightmare Jerky Stick
Justin Michael as Tex Jr. / Mr. Weaselbrat / Robby Burgles
JD Ryznar as Nick the New Guy
Nick Shakoour as Artichoke / Auntie Uncle
Ryan Wiesbrock as Beavers / Handsome Joe / Leroy
Clark Wiesbrock as Baby Possum
Todd McClintock as Live Action Buddy Thunderstruck
Chester Lee as Live Action Tex Jr.

Episodes

Season 1 (2017)

Interactive special (2017)

Awards and nominations

References

External links

 Buddy Thunderstruck - Netflix
 

2017 American television series debuts
2017 American television series endings
2010s American animated television series
American stop-motion animated television series
American children's animated action television series
American children's animated comedy television series
English-language Netflix original programming
Netflix children's programming
Television series by 9 Story Media Group
Animated television series by Netflix
Television series by Stoopid Buddy Stoodios
Animated television series about dogs